Kochyerigin DI-6 (internal designation TsKB-11) was a two-seat fighter biplane produced in the Soviet Union in the 1930s.

Design and development

The DI-6 was a conventional single-bay biplane of mixed construction with cable-retracted main landing gear. The pilot and the tail gunner sat in tandem cockpits, the pilot's open, and the gunner's partially enclosed. To maximize the gunner's arc of fire, the rear cockpit was set lower in the fuselage than the pilot's.

The DI-6 was developed at TsKB as a fighter that would also be capable of ground attack when fitted with different armament. Originally intended to use a liquid-cooled V-12 engine, problems with its development led to the choice of the Wright R-1820 radial engine instead. The first flight took place on 30 September 1934, and testing began in earnest in early 1935, with State Acceptance Trials following between May and November. Despite a number of weaknesses discovered during testing, the type was ordered into production, and deliveries to the Soviet Air Force commenced in the spring of 1937. Problems including excessive vibration, and a poor field of fire for the gunner, were never adequately resolved, and the various fixes implemented to cure these and other problems eventually added around 160 kg (350 lb) to the aircraft's weight. Production continued until 1939.

Operational history
Pre-Glastnost Western sources often reported these aircraft as having participated in the Battle of Khalkhin Gol against Japan in 1939, and even in the Winter War against Finland in 1939–1940, but more recent scholarship has failed to uncover any evidence that it was deployed in either case.

Surviving examples
A replica DI-6 is displayed in Victory Park, at the Museum of the Great Patriotic War in Moscow.

Variants
DI-6bis
Trainer with fixed landing gear.
DI-6Sh (TsKB-11Sh, TsKB-38)
Ground attack variant with armored pilot's seat and four forward-firing PV-1 machine guns under the bottom wing; 60 built.
DI-6MMSh
One prototype with M-300 X engine, did not enter production.

Operators

Soviet Air Force

Specifications (DI-6)

References

 
 Russian Aviation Museum 
 Уголок неба
 

1930s Soviet fighter aircraft
Kochyerigin aircraft
Sesquiplanes